Francesca Costa (16 February 1936 – 12 August 1961) was an Italian gymnast. She competed in six events at the 1960 Summer Olympics.

References

External links
 

1939 births
1961 deaths
Italian female artistic gymnasts
Olympic gymnasts of Italy
Gymnasts at the 1960 Summer Olympics
People from Lodi, Lombardy
Sportspeople from the Province of Lodi